Kalkoti, also known as Goedijaa, is an Indo-Aryan language spoken in the Kalkot Tehsil, in the Upper Dir district in Pakistan.

Phonology

The following tables outline the phonology of Kalkoti.

Vowels

Short vowels are slightly centralized; nasalization of vowels may be phonemic.

Consonants

The phonemes /q, ʦ, x, z, ɣ, ɽ/ have likely been introduced by loanwords. The voiceless aspirate series is secure, and, unlike the neighboring Palula language, Kalkoti does not have a breathy voiced series. The phonemic status of /ʔ/ is unclear and is likely tied to tone in Kalkoti.

Tone

Kalkoti's system of tone likely was similar to Shina's two tone system; however, under pressure from its Kohistani neighbors it may now have a more complex tone inventory.

References

Bibliography 

Dardic languages
Tonal languages in non-tonal families